Hum Films is a film production and distribution company based in Karachi, Pakistan, working under the Hum Network Limited. It was launched in September 2014, with setting a film Na Maloom Afraad to release domestically on 5 October 2014. The second film, banner released was a romance Bin Roye on 18 July 2015.

Filmography

See also
 List of film distributors in Pakistan

References

External links 
 

Film distributors of Pakistan
Films
Mass media companies of Pakistan
Mass media companies established in 2014
Companies based in Karachi
Film production companies of Pakistan